Monte Settepani is 1,386 metres high mountain in Liguria, northern Italy, part of the Ligurian Prealps.

Geography 

The mountain is located on the main chain of the Alps and its summit stands very close the water divide between Ligurian Sea and River Po basins, on the river Po side. Going South the Colle del Melogno (1,028 m) divides it from Bric Agnellino. On the summit stand some military facilities and a weather radar. The mountain is shared between the territories of five comuni: Osiglia, Bormida, Calizzano, Magliolo and Rialto.

SOIUSA classification 
According to the SOIUSA (International Standardized Mountain Subdivision of the Alps) the mountain can be classified in the following way:
 main part = Western Alps
 major sector =  South Western Alps
 section = Ligurian Alps
 subsection = Prealpi Liguri
 supergroup = Catena Settepani-Carmo-Armetta
 group = Gruppo del Monte Settepani
 subgroup = Costiera del Monte Settepani
 code = I/A-1.I-A.1.b

History 

The area of monte Settepani was involved, as well as other neighbouring mountains, in the Italian campaigns of Napoleone Bonaparte.

During the II World War around the Settepani occurred other fights, this time between Italian partisans and nazi-fascist troops.

Monte Settepani could have hosted an underground united States military base, a facility which, according to some sources, could have been also used by the Gladio Organization.

Access to the summit 

The summit of Monte Settepani is reached by a small asphalted road, closed to the general public and built in order to connect the military base on the mountain with the Colle del Melogno national road. The summit can also be reached on foot by some footpath from various starting points as, for instance,  the Colla Baltera.

Nature conservation 
The mountain and its surrounding area are part of a SIC (Site of Community Importance) called M.Carmo - M.Settepani (code: IT1323112).

Maps

References

Mountains of the Ligurian Alps
Mountains of Liguria
One-thousanders of Italy
Natura 2000 in Italy